Sir Frederick Morton Eden, 2nd Baronet, of Maryland (18 June 1766 – 14 November 1809) was an English writer on poverty and pioneering social investigator.

Early life

Frederick Morton Eden was the eldest son of Sir Robert Eden, 1st Baronet, of Maryland, and his wife Caroline Calvert, sister of the last Lord Baltimore and niece of Thomas Bladen's wife. His father was governor of Maryland and was created a baronet in 1776. Frederick inherited the baronetcy on the death of his father in 1784. Eden studied at Christ Church, Oxford.  He was one of the founders of the Globe Insurance Company and later its chairman.
 in 1809 he died suddenly at the office of the company he founded at the early age of 43.

Career
Eden’s reputation as a social investigator rests on  The State of the Poor,  published in 3 volumes in 1797.  He explained the circumstances that led him to do the research:
The difficulties which the labouring classes experienced, from the high price of grain, and of provisions in general, as well as of cloathing and fuel, during the years 1794 and 1795, induced me, from motives both of benevolence and personal curiosity, to investigate their conditions in various parts of the kingdom.
The book was intended to provide a factual basis for the current debate on what to do about the poor. Eden writes at the beginning of the book:
These and many similar questions [relating to the poor laws] cannot, as it seems to me, be fully and satisfactorily answered, unless many minute circumstances are previously stated, which have been rarely sufficiently attended to in the plausible and ingenious but unsolid speculations of several merely theoretic reasoners.

In the style of the time, the full title of the book is a catalogue of its contents:
The State of the Poor: or a history of the labouring classes in England, from the Conquest to the present period; in which are particularly considered, their domestic economy, with respect to diet, dress, fuel, and habitation; and the various plans which, from time to time, have been proposed and adopted for the relief of the poor: together with parochial reports relative to the administration of work-houses, and houses of industry; the state of the Friendly Societies, and other public institutions; in several agricultural, commercial and manufacturing, districts. With a large appendix; containing a comparative and chronological table of the prices of labour, of provisions, and of other commodities; an account of the poor in Scotland; and many original documents on subjects of national importance.

Eden did some of the field-work himself, obtained information from clergymen but also sent out "a remarkably faithful and intelligent person" with a questionnaire he had designed. This was modelled on that used by Sir John Sinclair in his Statistical Account of Scotland.

Influence and legacy
In  The Literature of Political Economy  McCulloch wrote of Eden's work "Altogether, this is the grand storehouse of information respecting the labouring classes of England, and should have a prominent place in every library."

Karl Marx wrote that Eden was "the only disciple of Adam Smith during the eighteenth century that produced any work of any importance"' (DNB). However, he also criticized his advocacy of expropriation of the poor and vulnerable by the ruling classes. In Capital, Marx cites Eden: "It may, perhaps be worthy the attention of the public to consider, whether any manufacture, which, in order to be carried on successfully, requires that cottages and workhouses should be ransacked for poor children; that they should be employed by turns during the greater part of the night and robbed of that rest which, though indispensable to all, is most required by the young; and that numbers of both sexes, of different ages and dispositions, should be collected together in such a manner that the contagion of example cannot but lead to profligacy and debauchery; will add to the sum of individual or national felicity?"

Edgeworth wrote the article on Eden in the original  Palgrave Dictionary.  He considered that the book entitled Eden to "rank with Arthur Young as one of those immediate successors of Adam Smith who best developed the inductive branch of political economy."

The twentieth-century British Prime Minister Anthony Eden was a kinsman and, according to a recent biography (D.R. Thorpe  Eden: The Life and Times of Anthony Eden ), he was influenced by F. M. Eden's work and kept a copy on his shelves throughout his life.

Family life
Eden married Anne Smith on 10 January 1792. They had eight children:

 Marianne Eden (c1793 – 13 May 1859)
 Sir Frederick Eden, 3rd Baronet (c1794- – December 1814)
 Caroline Eden (c1801 – 10 November 1854) married Vice-Admiral Hyde Parker
 Sir William Eden, 4th/6th Bt.+1 (31 Jan 1803 – 21 Oct 1873)
 Rt Reverend Robert Eden (2 September 1804 – 26 Aug 1886)
 Lieutenant-General George Morton Eden (10 May 1806 – November 1862)
 Unknown Eden (born 1806) married Arthur Keogh
 Vice-Admiral Sir Charles Eden (3 July 1808 – 7 Mar 1878)

See also
Eden baronets

References

Further reading
 Stone, Richard. (1997):  Some British Empiricists in the Social Sciences 1650–1900   Cambridge University Press, New York.
 Stone, M. (2001): Sir Frederick Morton Eden. In  Statisticians of the Centuries  (C.C. Heyde and E. Seneta, eds.), pp. 115–118. Springer , New York.

External links
 Retrieved September 2011
Eden, Frederick Morton, Sir, The state of the poor... Volume 1, 1797 (1966 facsimile) Retrieved 7 June 2022
Eden, Frederick Morton, Sir, The state of the poor... Volume 2, 1797 Retrieved 7 June 2022
Eden, Frederick Morton, Sir, The state of the poor... Volume 3, 1797 Retrieved 7 June 2022

18th-century British economists
British statisticians
1766 births
1809 deaths
Alumni of Christ Church, Oxford
Frederick Eden
Baronets in the Baronetage of Great Britain
18th-century British male writers